Befloxatone (MD-370,503) is a reversible inhibitor of monoamine oxidase A.

References

Reversible inhibitors of MAO-A
Monoamine oxidase inhibitors
Trifluoromethyl compounds
Secondary alcohols
3-(4-methoxyphenyl)-2-oxazolidinones